Ernest Waddell (born July 22, 1982)  is a New York City-based actor. He is perhaps best known for his recurring roles on two television series: Fin Tutuola's son Ken Randall on Law & Order: Special Victims Unit, and Omar Little's boyfriend Dante on The Wire. His credits also include the television series As the World Turns and One Tree Hill, and the film The Poker Game. He is also an abstract painter and photographer.

Biography
Ernest Waddell grew up in Bowie, Maryland. He developed an interest in acting and attended a summer program at the Oxford School of Drama before enrolling at New York University. When accepting his first recurring role, Waddell was apprehensive because he thought that appearances in The Wire would lead to him being typecast. Having appeared multiple times on Law & Order: Special Victims Unit, Waddell has stated that a big difference compared to The Wire is that SVU films under heavier time constraints.

Two of Waddell's favorite shows are Cosmos: A Personal Voyage and The Blue Planet. Ernest has also directed numerous short films. Connected to this is his work on www.imontvbitch.com, a self-help actor website, turned experimental video hub, which he co-founded with actor Brandon Scott. Referring to Waddell, Victoria Cartagena has stated that the two of them were cast in The Bedford Diaries because he helped her practice lines while waiting for an audition.

Filmography

References

External links 
 
 

1982 births
Living people
American male television actors